Cowley is a surname in the English language.

Etymology
The surname Cowley has numerous origins. In some cases it originated as a habitational name, derived from any of the several places in England named Cowley. One such place, in Gloucestershire, is derived from two Old English elements: the first, cu, meaning "cow"; the second element, leah, meaning "woodland clearing". Two other places are located in Derbyshire which are derived from the Old English col, meaning "coal" (in reference to charcoal). Another place is located near London, which can has two possible derivations: the first is from the Old English cofa, meaning "shelter" or "bay"; the second possibility is that this place name is derived from the Old English personal name Cofa. Other places are located in Buckinghamshire, Devon, Oxfordshire, and Staffordshire: these place names are thought to be derived from elements meaning "the wood or clearing of Cufa", although they may also contain topographical elements as well. In some cases the surname Cowley is derived from the Irish-language surname Mac Amhlaoibh, meaning "son of Amhlaoibh". The surname Cowley can also be of Manx language origin, where it has the same meaning as that of Irish, and has a variant, Kewley.

Families
The surname has been borne by a noted Irish family, who were one of the so-called 'Ten Tribes of Kilkenny'. The ten families bore the surnames Archdekin, Archer, Cowley, Knaresborough, Langton, Lawless, Ley, Ragget, Rothe, and Shee. Of the ten, only the Shees were considered to be of Irish ancestry; the nine others, including the Cowleys, were of English origin.

People with the surname
Abraham Cowley (1618–1667), English poet
R Adams Cowley (1917–1991), American surgeon
Alan Cowley, British professor of chemistry
Sir Alfred Cowley (1848–1926), Australian politician
A.E. Cowley (1849–1916), missionary in Sindh, then in western India
Ambrose Cowley, 17th century English explorer
Anne Cowley, American astronomer
Sir Arthur Cowley (librarian) (1861–1931), Bodley's Librarian at the University of Oxford
Bill Cowley (1912–1993), Canadian ice hockey player
Charles Henry Cowley VC (1872–1916), British naval officer
Darren Cowley (born 1976), English former cricketer
Edward Cowley, New Zealand-Samoan facilitator, entertainer and drag queen
Elizabeth Jill Cowley (born 1940), British botanist
Elwood Cowley (born 1944), Canadian former educator and politician
Ern Cowley (1892–1975), Australian rules footballer
Francis Cowley (born 1957), English former professional footballer
Garrick Cowley (born 1982), British rugby player
Gillian Cowley (born 1955), Zimbabwean hockey player
Hannah Cowley (artist) (born 1984), British actress and director
Hannah Cowley (writer) (1743–1809), English dramatist and poet
Harry Cowley (1890–1971), British social activist
Jack Cowley (1877–1926), English footballer
James Cowley (1919–2009), British soldier
Jason Cowley (born 1966), British journalist, magazine editor and writer
Jerry Cowley (born 1952), Irish barrister, doctor and politician
Joe Cowley (baseball), (born 1958), American former professional baseball player
Joe Cowley, American journalist
John Cowley (disambiguation)
Joy Cowley (born 1936), New Zealand novelist
Leonard Philip Cowley (1913–1973), American Roman Catholic bishop
Malcolm Cowley (1898–1989), American novelist
Mario Coyula Cowley, Cuban architect and architectural historian
Matthew Cowley (1897–1953), American missionary and Mormon leader
Matthias F. Cowley (1858–1940), American Mormon leader
Michael Cowley, Australian physiologist
Neil Cowley (born 1972), British jazz pianist
Nigel Cowley (born 1953), English former county cricketer
Patrick Cowley (1950–1982), American musician
Peter Cowley, British jump racing Champion Jockey (1908)
Peggy Cowley (1890–1970), American landscape painter
Philip Cowley, British political scientist
Richard Cowley (died 1619), English actor
Richard Colley (–1758), the grandfather of Arthur Wellesley, 1st Duke of Wellington, changed his surname to Wesley after he inherited estates from his cousin, Garret Wesley, in 1728
Robert Cowley (judge) (–1546), English-born judge who was Master of the Rolls in Ireland
Robert Cowley, American military historian
Roger Cowley (1939–2015), British physicist
Russell Cowley (born 1983), British ice hockey player
Samuel P. Cowley (1899–1934), American FBI agent
Sarah Cowley (disambiguation)
Simon Cowley (cricketer) (born 1979), English former cricketer
Simon Cowley (born 1980), Australian former breaststroke swimmer
Steven Cowley (born 1985), British physicist
Terence Cowley (1928–2012), Australian cricket player
Walter Cowley (–1548), Irish lawyer and politician
Wanda Cowley (1924–2017), New Zealand children's writer
Wayne Cowley (born 1964), Canadian retired professional ice hockey player

Fictional 
 George Cowley, one of the main characters in the TV series The Professionals

References

English-language surnames
Anglicised Irish-language surnames
Manx-language surnames
English toponymic surnames
Patronymic surnames